Paolo Stanzani (20 July 1936 – 18 January 2017) was an Italian mechanical engineer and automotive designer.

Biography

Graduated in 1962 in mechanical engineering from the University of Bologna, he was immediately hired by Automobili Ferruccio Lamborghini SpA on September 30, 1963 as assistant to Engineer Dallara, then the Company's Technical Director.
He worked for Lamborghini for many years. [2] Until 1967 Paolo Stanzani dealt in particular with dimensional-structural calculations, with the Experience Department (Engine test rooms, Road tests, Homologation) and relations with the body shops (Touring, Bertone, Marazzi, Zagato, Silat). It is the era of the 350 GT, 400 GT, Islero and above all the Miura. Considered one of the fathers of the Miura for technical development, from mid-1968 he took on the position of General Manager and Technical Director. These are the years in which legendary models such as the Espada, the Jarama, the Miura S, the Miura SV, the Urraco and the Countach enter production. While still in Lamborghini, Paolo Stanzani designs the BMW Turbo concept, designed by Paul Bracq (the shapes will be taken over six years later by the M1 supercar) and created to celebrate the 1972 Munich Olympics. The body is borrowed from Urraco, while the engine is a 2.0 four-cylinder derived from that of the 2002tii. [1]

After the sale of the company by the founder, at the beginning of 1975 he decided to leave it and devote himself to other projects, including the Ridracoli dam (FO). Between 1979 and 1986 he worked on contract design for some car manufacturers (Renault, Alfa Romeo, Suzuki) and founded an engineering and business administration studio in Bologna. This studio has grown over time, becoming the PRO Group, operating in IT as a global partner of companies in offering software for business management and in the management of organizational and technological projects. [1]

In 1987, together with the dealer Romano Artioli, he rebirth the Bugatti brand, founding Bugatti Automobili SpA in Campogalliano (MO). He was CEO and Technical Director of Bugatti until the mid-1990s, when he left the company due to irreconcilable conflicts with the majority shareholder, a few months before the presentation of his last supercar, the EB110.

Leaving Bugatti, he was called into F1 by Beppe Lucchini's Scuderia Italia. Here he found again in 1991 Eng. Dallara, supplier of frames for the Brescia team. He will continue with Scuderia Italia until 1996, and was the promoter of the team's merger with Minardi in 1994.

He is considered one of the "noble fathers" of the first Lamborghini production, in particular he had an important technical role in the creation of famous models, such as the "Miura", and was the father of the "Espada", the "Urraco", the "Countach" , [2] in addition to the Bugatti EB 110.

References

1936 births
2017 deaths
Italian automobile designers
Lamborghini people
Bugatti people
Formula One designers